Daulat Pura Daulat Pura is a town and union council of Charsadda District in Khyber Pakhtunkhwa province of Pakistan.

The Village Secretary is the Local Government Khyber Pakhtunkhwa Secretary for the Ministry of Local Government (Local Division).usually belonging to the Pakistan Administrative Service.

References

Union councils of Charsadda District
Populated places in Charsadda District, Pakistan